Agonopterix dierli is a moth in the family Depressariidae. It was described by Alexandr L. Lvovsky in 2011. It is found in Nepal.

The wingspan is 20–24 mm. The forewings are white with dark specks and a large black spot above the discal vein reaching the costal margin of the wing. The discal point is not marked with a black dotted line along the costal and outer margin. The hindwings are white.

Etymology
The species is named after the late Dr. Wolfgang Dierl, the collector of the type series.

References

Moths described in 2011
Agonopterix
Moths of Asia